Caroline Garcia defeated Bianca Andreescu in the final, 6–7(5–7), 6–4, 6–4 to win the singles tennis title at the 2022 Bad Homburg Open. She won the title after saving a match point in the semifinals, against Alizé Cornet.

Angelique Kerber was the defending champion, but lost in the quarterfinals to Cornet.

Seeds

Draw

Finals

Top half

Bottom half

Qualifying

Seeds

Qualifiers

Lucky losers

Draw

First qualifier

Second qualifier

Third qualifier

Fourth qualifier

References

External links 
 Main draw
 Qualifying draw
 Official website

Bad Homburg Open - Singles